John Steer (1824–1918) was an English-born merchant and political figure in Newfoundland. He represented Trinity Bay in the Newfoundland and Labrador House of Assembly from 1873 to 1878 as a Conservative.

He was born in Torquay, Devon and came to Newfoundland as an infant. He first worked as a dry goods clerk. Steer married Amelia, the sister of Charles R. Ayre. He worked in partnership with his brother-in-law from 1844 to 1858 and then opened his own dry goods store.

His son Francis Henry Steer later served in the Newfoundland legislative council.

References 
 

Members of the Newfoundland and Labrador House of Assembly
1824 births
1918 deaths
Newfoundland Colony people
English emigrants to pre-Confederation Newfoundland